The Turkish Basketball Federation is the national federation for basketball in Turkey. It is headquartered in Istanbul.

They organize the Basketball Super League, the Turkish Basketball Cup and the Turkish Basketball Presidential Cup. It is also responsible for appointing the management of the men's, women's and youth national basketball teams.

In October 2016 Hidayet Türkoğlu was elected as its president.

References

External links
 Turkish Basketball Federation official website 

Basketball
Federation
Basketball governing bodies in Europe
Sports organizations established in 1959
Organizations based in Istanbul
1959 establishments in Turkey